The following is a list of North Indian Ocean tropical cyclones from 1920 to 1929. Records from before the 1970s were extremely unreliable, and storms that stayed at sea were often only reported by ship reports.

1928

December 31, 1927 – January 5, 1928 – A depression existed over the southern Bay of Bengal.
February 29 – March 6, 1928 – A depression existed over the northeastern Arabian Sea.
March 24–28, 1928 – A cyclonic storm existed over the southern Bay of Bengal.

1927 
A tropical storm struck Maharashtra

1929
There were 15 depressions and 6 cyclonic storms.

See also
 1920s Australian region cyclone seasons
 1900–1940 South Pacific cyclone seasons
 1900–1950 South-West Indian Ocean cyclone seasons
Atlantic hurricane seasons: 1920, 1921, 1922, 1923, 1924, 1925, 1926, 1927, 1928, 1929
Eastern Pacific hurricane seasons: 1920, 1921, 1922, 1923, 1924, 1925, 1926, 1927, 1928, 1929
Western Pacific typhoon seasons: 1920, 1921, 1922, 1923, 1924, 1925, 1926, 1927, 1928, 1929

References

North Indian Ocean cyclone seasons
North Indian Ocean cyclone